Dizaj-e Mir Homay (also Romanized as Dīzaj-e Mīr Homāy; also known as Homāyābād and Homāy) is a village in Razliq Rural District, in the Central District of Sarab County, East Azerbaijan Province, Iran. At the 2006 census, its population was 15, in 5 families.

References 

Populated places in Sarab County